Sharovary (ir. sharavara, pers. شلوار -shalvar) are a kind of men's pants, part of the national clothes of Ukrainian Cossacks - are free to hips, often with assembly at the waist, collected at the bottom near the ankles.

Similar pants in other cultures are Sirwal, Salwar, Shalwar kameez, etc. 

The presence of wide trousers in the territory of Ukraine designed for riding originate with the Scythians.  Exposure to similar Turkish modes of dress would have occurred in battle on the steppes of Ukraine. The presence of sharovary in the dress of the Ukrainian Cossacks of Zaporizhia is noted by German ambassador  Erich Lassota in the 16th century. A comprehensive description of Cossack dress is included in the publication of 1651 Description of Ukraine by Polish-enlisted French-born cartographer and military engineer Guillaume Le Vasseur de Beauplan.  It lists the shirts, hats and kaptan of thick cloth that made up the Ukrainian Cossack everyday clothes.

See also

 European loose trousers
 Harem pants

Literature 
 Nikolayeva T. History of costume. - Kyiv Libid 1996

Ukrainian folk clothing
Trousers and shorts